Namumkin (transl. Impossible) is a 1988 Bollywood mystery film, telling the story of an Asian family exiled from Idi Amin's Uganda.  The screenplay was written by Bidhu Jha, who was later elected to the Legislative Assembly of Manitoba.

Plot
Shobha marries a Canada-based big wealthy businessman Ashok Saxena (Shreeram Lagoo) almost twice her age. On the wedding night, Saxena dies by falling out of his balcony. 

Sunil Kapoor and his associate get involved in an investigation due to the one million dollars insurance policy of Saxena. His death seems mysterious as the autopsy report mentioned heavy alcohol was consumed by Saxena, who was known to be a complete teetotaler.

Also, Sunil's friend Shakti was earlier engaged to Shobha, so he flies down to Canada to meet Shobha.

Together they start an investigation to find out what caused the death of Saxena and what circumstances caused it.

Cast
Raj Babbar as Sunil Kapoor
Vinod Mehra as Shakti Kaul
Zeenat Aman as Shobha
Sanjeev Kumar as Joseph D'Souza 
Shreeram Lagoo as Ashok Saxena
Om Shivpuri as Mr. Mathur

Soundtrack

External links

Indian drama films
1988 films
Films directed by Hrishikesh Mukherjee
Films scored by R. D. Burman
1980s Hindi-language films
Films shot in Houston
1988 drama films
Hindi-language drama films